Deekay is a Danish production and songwriting team founded by Lars Halvor Jensen, Martin Michael Larsson with other members Tim "Data" McEwan, Daniel "Obi" Klein and Johannes "Josh" Jørgensen. The name Deekay comes from the acronym dk, which means Denmark.

Deekay have written and produced for artists like Jason Derulo, Jordin Sparks, Lil Wayne, Diddy, Sugababes, Orianthi, JLS, Tinie Tempah, Jake Zyrus, Allison Iraheta, Method Man, Fat Joe, Styles P, Lemar, Medina, Mietta, Girls' Generation, Red Velvet, Loona, Exo, TVXQ and others.

Selected production/songwriting credits
Selected releases & recordings written and/or produced fully or in part by DEEKAY

New Kids on the Block
"Remix (I Like The)"  – Produced & co-written', Top 40 US Billboard Adult Radio
"10"  – Entire album produced, co-written and mixed, except track 10 & 11, #6 US Billboard 200 Album Chart

Diddy-Dirty Money feat. Lil Wayne
"Strobe Lights" – Co-produced & co-written
From Diddy/Dirty Money album Last Train to Paris, #7 US Billboard 200 Album Chart

Orianthi
"Believe" – co-written
Title-track on Orianthi's 2nd studio album, which has reached certified Gold status in Japan and Australia.

JLS
"Kickstart" & "Only Tonight" – Produced & co-written
From their UK No. 1 debut album, which sold in excess of 1.300.000 copies in the UK alone (4 x platinum)

"Eyes Wide Shut", "Superhero" & "Better For You" – Produced & co-written, Eyes Wide Shut featured Tinie Tempah and reached #2 on the official UK Radio Airplay Chart, with a total of more than 500.000.000 impressions
From their second album, "Outta This World"

Sugababes
"Change" – Produced & co-written
Title-track on UK #1 album "Change" – the song was a top 3 UK radio airplay hit.

Lemar
"I Don't Mind That" – Produced & written
From multi-platinum album "Time To Grow"

"It's Not That Easy" – Co-written
1st single from multi-platinum album "The Truth About Love" – No. 2 Official UK Radio Airplay Chart & No. 7 UK Single Sales Chart

Jedward
"Lipstick" – Produced & co-written
Hit No. 1 on the iTunes single chart in Germany, Sweden, Austria and Ireland.

"Victory"– 7 tracks produced & co-written, #1 Ireland
"Young Love" – Produced & co-written, #1 iTunes Sweden
"Young Love" – 2 tracks produced & co-written, #1 Ireland

Joe McElderry
"Until The Stars Run Out" – Produced & co-written
From his debut album, which entered the UK album chart at #3.

Ashley Tisdale
"Switch" & "I'm Back" – Produced & co-written
The first track is included in the credits of the 2009 movie Aliens in the Attic and both of them are included in the Tidale's second studio album, Guilty Pleasure.

Girls' Generation
"Hoot" from the album Hoot (009) – Programmed & co-written
Hit no. 1 on all Korean charts 7 minutes after release – 150.000+ pre-orders on "Hoot" album...The song was No. 1 for 5 weeks on the Music Bank K-Chart and won the Triple Crown on the Inkigayo chart in November/December 2010. The Hoot EP achieved 18 x platinum status in Korea and became best song of the year according to Gallup Korea.

"Hoot" from the album Girls' Generation
The album became the first ever from a foreign girl group to top the Official Japanese Oricon Chart on the release date. The album sold 231,553 copies in the first week, placed first on the Oricon Weekly Album Chart and surpassed the record for first week debut album sales for a foreign artist.

"Reflection" from the album Girls' Generation II: Girls & Peace - co-written and co-produced
"Check" from the album Lion Heart - co-written and co-produced
"Seventeen" from the album Forever 1 - co-written and co-produced

TVXQ
"Superstar" – Co-written
Hit no. 1 on the Oricon Daily Chart and No. 1 on the Billboard Hot 100 Japan.
"Smile" - Co-Produced by Daniel "Obi" Klein
From the Rise as God album

Blue
"Breathe Easy", "Bubblin'" & "Back It Up" – Produced & co-written
From the multi-platinum UK No. 1 album Guilty

"Breathe Easy" was the third single from the album and a UK #4. It was an 8-week consecutive No. 1 in Italy and the biggest selling single there in 2004 in front of records like "Yeah", "Toxic" & "Superstar". It was also a hit in the rest of Europe (#7 in Austria & Germany etc.)"

"Bubblin'" was the 4th single from the album and a UK #6. It also became a smash hit all over Europe, top 3 in Italy, top 15 in France, No. 11 Germany etc.

Loona
"Eclipse" was the title track for the single "Kim Lip" by the member Kim Lip herself.
"Puzzle" was the B track for the single "Choerry" by the member Choerry herself in collaboration with the previous member JinSoul.

S.M. Entertainment Artists

References

External links 
 Deekay Music
 Interview with Multi-platinum Record Production Team Deekay
 Amazon – Randy Jackson's Music Club, Vol. 1

Record production teams
Songwriting teams